Lehua Fernandes Salling (born December 6, 1949) is an American politician who served in the Hawaii Senate from 1983 to 1999.

References

1949 births
Living people
Democratic Party Hawaii state senators